Francis Robertson "Frank" Iler Jr. is a Republican member of the North Carolina House of Representatives. Iler has represented the 17th district (including constituents in Brunswick County) since 2009. A retired businessman who lives in Oak Island, North Carolina, Iler was appointed when Bonner Stiller resigned in 2009.

Electoral history

2020

2018

2016

2014

2012

2010

Committee assignments

2021-2022 session
Appropriations (Vice Chair)
Appropriations - Transportations (Chair)
Transportation (Chair)
Environment (Vice Chair)
Commerce
Education - K-12
Election Law and Campaign Finance Reform
Marine Resources and Aqua Culture

2019-2020 session
Appropriations (Vice Chair)
Appropriations - Transportation (Chair)
Transportation (Chair)
Environment
Education - K-12
Commerce
Insurance

2017-2018 session
Appropriations (Vice Chair)
Appropriations - Transportation (Chair)
Transportation (Chair)
Environment
Education - K-12
Elections and Ethics Law
Insurance

2015-2016 session
Appropriations (Vice Chair)
Appropriations - Transportation (Chair)
Transportation (Chair)
Environment
Education - K-12
Elections
Insurance

2013-2014 session
Appropriations
Transportation (Chair)
Environment
Education
Elections
Regulatory Reform

2011-2012 session
Appropriations
Transportation (Chair)
Environment
Education
Elections

2009-2010 session
Appropriations
Transportation
Education
Marine Resources and Aquaculture
Wildlife Resources

References

External links

Living people
1942 births
People from Brunswick County, North Carolina
Campbell University alumni
Republican Party members of the North Carolina House of Representatives
21st-century American politicians